The 2009 Calder Cup playoffs of the American Hockey League (AHL) began on April 15, 2009. The 16 teams that qualified, 8 from each conference, played best-of-seven series for division semifinals, finals and conference finals. The conference champions then played a best-of-seven series for the Calder Cup. The Hershey Bears defeated the Manitoba Moose four games to two in the finals to win the Calder Cup.

Playoff seeds
After the 2008–09 AHL regular season, 16 teams qualified for the playoffs. The top four teams from each division qualified for the playoffs.

Eastern Conference

Atlantic Division
Hartford Wolf Pack – 99 points
Providence Bruins – 94 points
Portland Pirates – 88 points
Worcester Sharks – 87 points

East Division
Hershey Bears – 106 points
Bridgeport Sound Tigers – 106 points
Wilkes-Barre/Scranton Penguins – 104 points
Philadelphia Phantoms – 93 points

Western Conference

North Division
Manitoba Moose – 107 points
Hamilton Bulldogs – 102 points
Grand Rapids Griffins – 98 points
Toronto Marlies – 90 points

West Division
Milwaukee Admirals – 107 points
Peoria Rivermen – 92 points
Houston Aeros – 87 points
Rockford IceHogs – 86 points

Bracket

In each round, the team that earned more points during the regular season receives home ice advantage, meaning they receive the "extra" game on home-ice if the series reaches the maximum number of games. There is no set series format due to arena scheduling conflicts and travel considerations.

Statistical leaders

Skaters

These are the top ten skaters based on points.

GP = Games played; G = Goals; A = Assists; Pts = Points; +/– = Plus/minus; PIM = Penalty minutes

All statistics as of: 08:54, 26 April 2010 (UTC)

Goaltending

These are the top five goaltenders based on both goals against average and save percentage with at least one game played (Note: list is sorted by goals against average).

GP = Games played; W = Wins; L = Losses; SA = Shots against; GA = Goals against; GAA = Goals against average; SV% = Save percentage; SO = Shutouts; TOI = Time on ice (in minutes)

All statistics as of: 08:54, 26 April 2010 (UTC)

Division Semifinals 
Note 1: All times are in Eastern Daylight Time (UTC−4).
Note 2: Home team is listed first.

Eastern Conference

Atlantic Division

(A1) Hartford Wolf Pack vs. (A4) Worcester Sharks

(A2) Providence Bruins vs. (A3) Portland Pirates

East Division

(E1) Hershey Bears vs. (E4) Philadelphia Phantoms 

Due to scheduling issues, Philadelphia hosted the first two games of the series. These would be their last 2 games in Philadelphia, as the team would move to Adiriondack after the season.

(E2) Bridgeport Sound Tigers vs. (E3) Wilkes-Barre/Scranton Penguins 

Note: First two games were played at Nassau Veterans Memorial Coliseum due to scheduling issues.

Western Conference

North Division

(N1) Manitoba Moose vs. (N4) Toronto Marlies

(N2) Hamilton Bulldogs vs. (N3) Grand Rapids Griffins

West Division

(W1) Milwaukee Admirals vs. (W4) Rockford IceHogs

(W2) Peoria Rivermen vs. (W3) Houston Aeros

Division Finals

Eastern Conference

Atlantic Division

(A2) Providence Bruins vs. (A4) Worcester Sharks

East Division

(E1) Hershey Bears vs. (E3) Wilkes-Barre/Scranton Penguins

Western Conference

North Division

(N1) Manitoba Moose vs. (N3) Grand Rapids Griffins

West Division

(W1) Milwaukee Admirals vs. (W3) Houston Aeros

Conference Finals

Eastern Conference

(E1) Hershey Bears vs. (A2) Providence Bruins

Western Conference

(N1) Manitoba Moose vs. (W3) Houston Aeros

Calder Cup Finals

(N1) Manitoba Moose vs. (E1) Hershey Bears

See also
2008–09 AHL season
List of AHL seasons

References

Calder Cup playoffs
Calder Cup